KHSS (100.7 FM, "Global Catholic Radio") is a radio station broadcasting a Catholic Religious format. Licensed to Athena, Oregon, United States.  Two Hearts Communications, LLC, has been the licensee of KHSS since 1998.

References

External links

HSS